is a district located in Gifu Prefecture, Japan.

As of October 2020 the district has an estimated population of 42,594. The total area is 59.27 km2.

Towns and villages
Anpachi
Gōdo
Wanouchi

Merger
On March 27, 2006, town of Sunomata, along with the town of Kamiishizu from Yōrō District, merged into the city of Ōgaki.

Notes

Districts in Gifu Prefecture